Events in the year 2004 in the Islamic Republic of Iran.

Incumbents
 Supreme Leader: Ali Khamenei
 President: Mohammad Khatami
 Vice President: Mohammad-Reza Aref
 Chief Justice: Mahmoud Hashemi Shahroudi

Events

 Since 2004 until 2005 – Canada evokes its ambassador to Iran and in 2005 restates that until Iran has the same opinion to a global inquiry into Zahra Kazemi’s death, Canada will not restart political relations with Iran.
 February 18 – A train carrying a convoy of petrol, fertiliser, and sulfur derails and explodes in Nishapur, Iran, killing 320 people.
 February 20 – Conservatives win a majority in the Iranian parliament election.
 May 3 – Pas Tehran become 2003–2004 Iranian Premier Soccer League  Champions.
 July 20 – Ehsan Haddadi wins gold with a 62.14m discus throw.
 July 20 – Iran finishes 14th at IAAF World Junior Track-and-Field Championships.

Births
31 January – Amir Ebrahimzadeh, football player

Notable deaths

 April 30 – Kioumars Saberi Foumani, 62, also known as "Gol-Agha", Iranian satirist

References

 
Iran